Euripides L. Evriviades (born 1954) is a Cypriot former diplomat who served as High Commissioner of Cyprus to the UK, accredited to the Court of St. James's and Permanent Representative of Cyprus to the International Maritime Organization (IMO).  He chaired the Board of Governors of the Commonwealth Secretariat, having previously chaired its Executive Committee. He was born in Larnaca, Cyprus and is married to Anastasia Iacovidou-Evriviades, an attorney-at-law.

Biography
Euripides L. Evriviades is High Commissioner of the Republic of Cyprus to the United Kingdom of Great Britain and Northern Ireland as of 4 November 2013. Before assuming this post, he was Deputy Permanent Secretary / Political Director of the Ministry of Foreign Affairs (Jan. 2012–Nov. 2013) serving, intermittently, as Acting Permanent Secretary. Prior, he served as Ambassador / Permanent Representative to the Council of Europe (Nov. 2008–Jan. 2012), having also chaired its Rapporteur Group on External Relations (2011).  Previously, he was Political Director of the Ministry (2006-2008), having concurrent accreditation to the State of Kuwait, pro tem Nicosia. 

Mr Evriviades was Ambassador to the United States of America and non-resident High Commissioner to Canada, serving concomitantly as: the Permanent Representative to the International Civil Aviation Organization; the Permanent Observer to the Organization of American States; and Representative to the World Bank and the International Monetary Fund (2003-2006). He also served as Ambassador to the Netherlands (2000-2003) and to Israel (1997-2000). Earlier in his career, he held positions at Cypriot embassies in Bonn, Germany (1986-1988); Moscow, USSR/Russia (1988-1993); and Tripoli, Libya (1995).

He started his diplomatic career in 1976 at the Cyprus Consulate General in New York as Vice-Consul (1976–78) and later as Consul (1978-1982). He also held the position of First Secretary at the Permanent Mission of Cyprus to the United Nations (1980-1982). From 1976 to 1980, he was a member of the Cyprus Delegation to the Third United Nations Conference on the Law of the Sea (4th–10th sessions).

High Commissioner Evriviades holds a master's degree in Public Administration (MPA - policy area of concentration: International Affairs and Security) from the John F Kennedy School of Government, Harvard University (1984) which he attended as a Fulbright Fellow. He graduated (cum laude, 1976) with a Bachelor of Science degree in Business Administration from the University of New Hampshire.

He received a Doctor of Laws, Honoris Causa, from his alma mater, the University of New Hampshire (21 May 2005).

Published works
Evriviades has published articles on the Cyprus question, on Turkey, security issues of the Eastern Mediterranean, on the Law of the Sea and on diplomacy. He also lectured extensively on these issues. Some of his most recent articles include:

2022: The New Cold War and Ukraine , RUSI - Royal United Services Institute
2018: A Reinvigorated Commonwealth, Diplomat Magazine
 2018: Cyprus as an EU and Commonwealth Member State: Its Hopes and Ambitions, The Round Table: The Commonwealth Journal of International Affairs, VOL 107, NO. 2, 251-253
 2017:The Food of Love, Diplomat Magazine
2017: Cyprus, the EU and the Eastern Mediterranean, Global Strategy Forum Lecture Series 2016-2017
 2016:Diplomacy and the Politics of Fear, Diplomat Magazine
 2016: #SHAKESPEARE400 - To Tweet or Not To Tweet?, Diplomat Magazine
 2016: High Commissioner for the Republic of Cyprus to the UK: “A Brexit would not be in the interests of the Commonwealth”, LSE EUROPP Blog
 2015:A European Island in the Commonwealth, Diplomat Magazine
 2001: US-Turkey Contingency Planning and Soviet Reaction 1978-1983, THEMATA Policy & Defense, Defense Analysis Institute, Athens

Honours, decorations, awards and distinctions
Awards

 Award for Distinguished Contribution to Diplomacy in London (London, 2017)
 Voted by his peers as Diplomat of Year from Europe (London, 2015)
 The King Legacy Award for International Service, by the Committee on the International Salute to the Life and Legacy of Dr. Martin Luther King, Jr., A Man for All Nations (Washington DC, 2006)
 "Ambassador of the Year", by the Stichting Vrienden van Saur ("Friends of Saur") Foundation (The Hague, October 2003)

Decorations

 Freeman of the City of London (London, 23 January 2017)
 Great Commander of the Order of the Orthodox Knights of the Church of the Holy Sepulcher (Jerusalem, February 2000)
 Order of Merit (First Class) of the Federal Republic of Germany (Bonn, March 1989)

References

External links
Official Twitter account
Cyprus High Commission in London

1954 births
Living people
High Commissioners of Cyprus to the United Kingdom
Ambassadors of Cyprus to the United States
University of New Hampshire alumni
Harvard Kennedy School alumni